The clouded lizardfish (Saurida nebulosa) is a species of lizardfish that lives mainly in the south Pacific Ocean.

Biology
The clouded lizardfish is known to eat other fish. They are a species that camouflage in order to wait for their prey. At times they will pop their heads out of the sand. It is also recorded that they have one or two lines of teeth on their jaw.

Names
The common names of the clouded lizardfish include:
Nebulous lizardfish
Clouded saury
Clouded grinner
Blotched lizardfish
Blotched saury
Blotched grinner

Size
The average size of an unsexed male is about 16.5 centimeters.

Habitat
The clouded lizardfish can be found in reef-based environments in tropical climates. They are common to the areas of sand, mud, rock, eel-grass habitats, mangroves and seagrass beds, near streams, and river mouths. They are native to:
Mauritius to the Society Islands
North to the Hawaiian Islands
South to Sydney Harbor
New South Wales, Australia

References

External links
 

Synodontidae
Fish described in 1850